Pulverro is a genus of aphid wasps in the family Crabronidae. There are about 13 described species in Pulverro.

Species
These 13 species belong to the genus Pulverro:

 Pulverro boharti N. Smith, 1983
 Pulverro californicus Eighme, 1973
 Pulverro chumashano Pate, 1937
 Pulverro coconino N. Smith, 1983
 Pulverro columbianus (Kohl, 1890)
 Pulverro constrictus (Provancher, 1895)
 Pulverro costano Pate, 1937
 Pulverro eighmei N. Smith, 1983
 Pulverro laevis (Provancher, 1895)
 Pulverro mescalero Pate, 1937
 Pulverro mexicanus N. Smith, 1983
 Pulverro monticola Eighme, 1969
 Pulverro patei N. Smith, 1983

References

Crabronidae
Articles created by Qbugbot